Vivian Rosenthal (born February 7, 1976) is an American designer and entrepreneur.

Early life
Vivian Rosenthal was raised in New York City, graduated from Friends Seminary in 1994 and from Brown University in 1998. She received a master's degree from Columbia University's Graduate School of Architecture in 2001.

Career
Rosenthal is the founder of Snaps, a platform for marketing in the messaging space. Snaps is used by brands to upload and manage their own emoji, sticker, gif, and video content. It partners with Kik, Tango, and Viber to distribute content on IOS and Android. Snaps clients include Pepsi, Burger King, Viacom, Sony Pictures, Warner Bros, L.A. Kings, Atlanta Hawks, L'Oreal and many others. Snaps has been featured in Fortune Magazine, WSJ, and Venture Beat.

Rosenthal was selected as Chief Founder in Residence for 30Weeks – Google’s founders program for designers. She discussed Snaps and fan engagement with Will.I.Am. for the WSJ. As part of the Digital Pioneer series, Vivian was featured on FWA and was chosen as one of 16 women making headlines for their industry impact by Crain’s New York.

She wrote and performed a poem on the future of technology and its impact on humanity for the Remix Conference.

Previously, Rosenthal co-founded Tronic Studio with Jesse Seppi, a digital media and experiential design company. She has been named one of Creativity Magazine's top 50 global creatives of 2010 and has spoken at numerous conferences on the intersection of advertising and technology, including the recent CaT conference by Ad Age. She has been selected as a jury member for the Andy Awards, One Show Interactive Awards, and the Art Directors Club.

Rosenthal has spoken on the future of mobile, augmented reality and gaming at TEDxSiliconAlley, Ad Tech, Socialize West, and Geekend.

References

External links
Rosenthal in Fast Company - Who’s Next: Vivian Rosenthal’s Big Idea For Interactive Advertising
Rosenthal in Ad Week - Spotlight: Vivian Rosenthal
GoldRun featured on GigaOm - GoldRun Leverages Augmented Reality for Mobile Marketing – Old GigaOm
GoldRun featured on the Today Show - MSN | Outlook, Office, Skype, Bing, Breaking News, and Latest Videos 
GoldRun featured in The New York Times - A Network and a Retailer Seek Synergy
GoldRun featured on Mashable - Startup Adds Augmented Reality to Location-Based Marketing
GoldRun featured on PSFK - Y&R Picks Mobile Platform GoldRun To Allow Airwalk to Execute the World's First Invisible Pop Up Store
DMEXCO - Vivian Rosenthal at Dmexco
TEDX Silicon Alley Talk - TEDx Talks - YouTube
Bloomberg Money Moves - Bloomberg - Are you a robot?
L'Oreal Women in Digital Award Winners - L'Oreal Spotlights Female-Led Digital Startups With NEXT Generation Awards
CES Interview - Under Construction

American technology chief executives
Brown University alumni
Columbia Graduate School of Architecture, Planning and Preservation alumni
1976 births
Living people
American women chief executives
21st-century American women